Dyavre is a 2013 Indian Kannada-language drama film written and directed by Gadda Viji and produced by Jayanna Bhogendra, co-produced by Rajesh Bhat. The film stars Yogaraj Bhat (in his acting debut), Sathish Ninasam, Sonu Gowda, and Sruthi Hariharan. The dialogues are written by Yogaraj Bhat and Gadda Viji. The songs are composed by Veer Samarth.

Plot 
The film revolves around of prisoners who land in jail for various reasons. In his first movie, director Gadda Viji has tried experimenting with a different colour  He has excellently captured the innocence of criminals who land in jail for reasons not known to them and become victims of circumstances. Each criminal has his own story that touches your heart.  There is drama in every criminal's life. Full marks to Gadda Viji for the brilliant way of handling stories of prisoners who land in jail for various reasons.

Cast 
 Yogaraj Bhat as Bhimsen 
 Sathish Ninasam as Chinkara 
 Sonu Gowda as  Shruthi Kalappa
 Sruthi Hariharan
 Sonia Gowda as Chaya
 Nataranga Rajesh as Jaggu
 Sathya as Savanth 
 Mico Nagaraj as Home Minister
 Chetan Gandarva
 Rajesh Nataranga
Petrol Prasanna

Production 
The film is directed by Gadda Viji, an assistant director of Yogaraj Bhat, in his directorial debut. The film was earlier titled Pappasu Kalli.

Soundtrack
Veer Samarth has composed the songs. Yogaraj Bhat and Jayanth Kaikini has penned the lyrics.

Release and reception
The film released on 6 December 2013 along with Advaitha and B3. The film released to positive reviews. The Times of India gave the film a rating of four out of five stars and stated that "Each criminal has his own story that touches your heart". Bangalore Mirror wrote that "Overall, the film has a novel approach in not just story-telling, but the plot itself and the drawbacks are covered up quite cleverly." Deccan Chronicle wrote that "Barring a few scenes, Yograj has impressed all as a jailor with able support of the inmates - the roles were played by Neenasum Satish, and others". Sify wrote that "The debutante director has made a wise choice of selecting the perfect subject and perfect star cast to suit the characters for his debut movie. The movie has certainly made Gadda Viji join the list of promising directors of the year".

References

External links 
 

2013 directorial debut films
2013 films
2013 drama films
Indian drama films